The rupicolous gerbil (Dipodillus rupicola) is a species of rodent in the family Muridae.
It is found only in Mali.
Its natural habitats are dry savanna and rocky areas.

References

Dipodillus
Mammals described in 2002
Taxonomy articles created by Polbot
Taxobox binomials not recognized by IUCN